Swerdlow is a surname. Notable people with the surname include: 

Anthony Swerdlow, British epidemiologist
Ezra Swerdlow, American film producer
Jenna Rose Swerdlow (born 1998), American singer
Joel Swerdlow, American journalist
Michael Swerdlow (born 1943), American real estate developer
Noel Swerdlow (1941–2021), American academic